Andrei Gotsmanov (born 6 May 1986) is a Belarusian footballer.

Career

College
Gotsmanov grew up in Woodbury, Minnesota and played college soccer at Creighton University, with whom he earned the Missouri Valley Conference Player of the Year Award and was named MVC Tournament MVP. Moreover, Gotsmanov was also awarded a first-team selection on the 2008 NSCAA/adidas Men's Division I All-America Team, as well as a Hermann Trophy semi-finalist.

Professional
Gotsmanov was drafted in the second round (24th overall) of the 2009 MLS SuperDraft by New England Revolution, but opted to finish college before turning pro.

After graduating Gotsmanov attempted to re-join Revolution, but was unsuccessful as the Revolution would have had to drop a player from their squad in order to sign him. As a result, Gotsmanov went on trial with Sweden's Mjällby AIF. Despite scoring twice in a friendly for Mjällby, he was not offered a contract.

Upon his return from Sweden, Gotsmanov played with the Nebraska-based amateur team 402 FC which qualified for the 2009 Lamar Hunt U.S. Open Cup; he scored in the team's 3-2 first round loss to the Minnesota Thunder, but impressed the Thunder's coaches with his performance. He signed with the Thunder in July 2009, and made his debut for them on 11 July 2009, in a 3-0 win over Montreal Impact. On 17 February 2010 signed with new founded NSC Minnesota Stars of the USSF Division 2. He re-signed with the club, now playing in the North American Soccer League, on 22 March 2011.

Gotsmanov was re-signed by Minnesota United FC (which was re-branded from the NSC Minnesota Stars following the teams purchase prior to the 2013 season by Bill Mcguire) on 13 August 2015.  Gotsmanoav was released on April 12, 2016.

Personal
Andrei is the son of former professional footballer Sergey Gotsmanov, a four-time Belarusian Footballer of the Year who played for the Soviet Union at the 1988 UEFA European Football Championship. He was born in Minsk, then part of the Soviet Union, but came to the United States with his family in 1996 when his father signed to play for Minnesota Thunder. He also has an older brother, Sasha, who played for the Colorado Rapids and the former professional club Minnesota Thunder.

References

External links
 Creighton profile
 Interview with Gotsmanov at MLSDraft.net

1986 births
Living people
Footballers from Minsk
People from Eagan, Minnesota
American soccer players
Creighton Bluejays men's soccer players
USL First Division players
Minnesota Thunder players
Minnesota United FC (2010–2016) players
Belarusian emigrants to the United States
Belarusian footballers
USSF Division 2 Professional League players
North American Soccer League players
New England Revolution draft picks
Sportspeople from the Minneapolis–Saint Paul metropolitan area
All-American men's college soccer players
Association football midfielders